Pioner is a rural locality (a village) in Chishminsky Selsoviet, Birsky District, Bashkortostan, Russia. The population was 52 as of 2010. There is 1 street.

Geography 
Pioner is located 32 km west of Birsk (the district's administrative centre) by road. Aygildino is the nearest rural locality.

References 

Rural localities in Birsky District